An egoist is an adherent of a philosophy of egoism, which may encompass a variety of views on the role of the self as the motivation or goal of one's own action.

Egoist may also refer to:

An egotist, a person who believes in their own importance or superiority
An adherent of egoist anarchism
The Egoist (novel), 1879 novel by George Meredith
Gli egoisti (1959), by Bonaventura Tecchi, English translation publishes as The Egoists (1964)
The Egoist (periodical), literary magazine founded by Dora Marsden
The Egoists, film
Egoist (band), a band produced by Ryo of Supercell with vocals by Chelly
"Egoist" (song), a song by Falco
"Egoist", a song by Kent from their compilation album Best Of
"Egoist", a song by Loona from their single album Olivia Hye

The word's French cognate Égoïste may refer to:
Égoïste, a perfume
Égoïste (magazine), a French magazine